The Colceag is a left tributary of the river Mostiștea in Romania. It flows into the Mostiștea in Măriuța.

References

Rivers of Romania
Rivers of Călărași County
Rivers of Ialomița County
Rivers of Ilfov County